Joshua William Paul (born May 19, 1975) is a retired American professional baseball catcher and professional coach. He most recently served as the quality control coach for the Detroit Tigers of Major League Baseball (MLB). He played in MLB for the Los Angeles Angels, Chicago White Sox, Chicago Cubs, and Tampa Bay Devil Rays. He also coached the Angels and New York Yankees.

Playing career

Amateur
Paul attended Buffalo Grove High School in Buffalo Grove, Illinois, and Vanderbilt University, where he played college baseball for the Vanderbilt Commodores. In 1995, he played collegiate summer baseball for the Cotuit Kettleers of the Cape Cod Baseball League (CCBL). He hit .364 to lead the league, and was named the league's MVP and outstanding pro prospect. Paul was inducted into the CCBL Hall of Fame in 2006.

Professional
The Chicago White Sox selected Paul in the 1996 MLB draft. He was signed by the Chicago Cubs, but was again released in October of the same year. He was traded after the  season to the Devil Rays for minor league third baseman Travis Schlichting.

After starting catcher Toby Hall was traded to the Los Angeles Dodgers, Dioner Navarro came to Tampa Bay as the Devil Rays' main catcher. Paul was limited to 35 games in  because of hand and elbow injuries. On February 1, the Rays signed Paul to a minor league contract with an invitation to spring training. After failing to make the team, Paul was released and signed with the Houston Astros on April 6. On June 14, Paul was released by the Astros. In his nine-year major league career he batted .244/.303/.341 with 10 home runs and 5 stolen bases.

Paul, who lost a friend in the September 11, 2001 attacks, was a proponent of playing games scheduled on September 11, 2002.

Post-playing career
In December 2008, the New York Yankees named Paul as the manager of the Staten Island Yankees, their minor league affiliate in the Class A-Short Season New York-Penn League. Paul served as interim bullpen coach for the New York Yankees in 2010 while Dave Eiland was away from the team for personal reasons. From 2014 through 2017, Paul served as the Yankees' minor league catching coordinator.

The Angels hired Paul as their bench coach after the 2017 season.

The Tigers hired Paul as their quality control coach prior to the 2020 season, a position he served in until being dismissed following the 2022 season.  On September 22, 2020, the Tigers added interim bench coach to his duties when Ron Gardenhire suddenly retired and bench coach Lloyd McClendon was promoted to interim manager.

Personal life
Josh's younger brother, Jeremy, is also a baseball player.

References

External links

Boston.com news article

1975 births
Living people
Anaheim Angels players
Baseball coaches from Illinois
Baseball players from Chicago
Birmingham Barons players
Chicago Cubs players
Chicago White Sox players
Charlotte Knights players
Cotuit Kettleers players
Detroit Tigers coaches
Gulf Coast White Sox players
Hickory Crawdads players
Iowa Cubs players
Los Angeles Angels coaches
Los Angeles Angels of Anaheim coaches
Major League Baseball bench coaches
Major League Baseball catchers
Minor league baseball managers
Montgomery Biscuits players
New York Yankees scouts
Round Rock Express players
Salt Lake Stingers players
Sportspeople from Chicago
Sportspeople from Evanston, Illinois
Tampa Bay Devil Rays players
Vero Beach Devil Rays players
Winston-Salem Warthogs players
Vanderbilt Commodores baseball players